The Polish 1st Heavy Artillery Regiment (1 Pułk Artylerii Najcięższej) was formed in mid-1920 and saw limited combat at the end of the Polish-Soviet War in 1920. At the time, the unit was equipped with  mortars and  cannons. By 1921 the regiment was motorized and  howitzers were added. In 1934, the unit was moved to Gora Kalwaria.

World War II 
In 1938, the  howitzers were handed down to the heavy artillery regiments. During the Invasion of Poland in 1939, one out of three battalions was assigned to Armia Modlin, and two battalions to the 38th Infantry Division (Poland).

References

External links 
  Dyon during military field exercise, circa 1938.

Regiments of Poland's land forces
Artillery regiments
Military units and formations established in 1920